CloudPets was an Internet-connected soft toy manufactured by now defunct Spiral Toys that was the subject of numerous security vulnerabilities in February 2017. The plush teddy bear-style toys used Bluetooth to connect to a parent's smartphone to allow distant family members to send voice messages to the toy, and allow children to send voice messages back.

Security researchers demonstrated that the toy itself was insecure and could be trivially accessed via Bluetooth. The personal records of over 820,000 owners of the toy were stored in an insecure MongoDB database. Attackers also replaced the database with a ransom demand pointing to a Bitcoin address. Data retrieved from the CloudPets database was sent to the Australian security researcher Troy Hunt who included it in Have I Been Pwned?, a database of users whose data has been compromised. The database of user records also contained links pointing to over 2.2 million audio files hosted on Amazon Web Services containing the voice messages sent to and from the toys. Hunt stated that the database hack was "ridiculously easy".

Following disclosure of security vulnerabilities, CloudPets started enforcing stronger password requirements on users of the service—they had previously not enforced any password complexity requirements and their documentation had suggested short, weak passwords. Numerous journalists and security researchers including Hunt noted that the company was non-responsive to disclosures from security researchers and enquiries from journalists.

See also 
 Computer security
 Internet of things
 My Friend Cayla, another Internet-connected children's toy

References 

2010s toys
Teddy bears
Hacking in the 2010s
Cyberattacks
Internet of things
Electronic toys
Criticisms of software and websites
Toy controversies